Schmelz is a municipality in the district of Saarlouis, in Saarland, Germany. It is situated approximately 15 km northeast of Saarlouis, and 25 km northwest of Saarbrücken.

The town of Schmelz (which translates to Glaze) is made of six municipalities, Schmelz itself – which consists of Außen and Bettingen – and Hüttersdorf, Limbach, Michelbach, Primsweiler, and Dorf im Bohnental.  These independent villages in the Saarlouis district date back to Roman times. A native of Schmelz would be called a Schmelzer as in a person from Berlin being referred to as a Berliner.

References

Saarlouis (district)